Nie do Poznania is the third album of Polish punk rock band Abaddon.

Track listing
"Intro/Przemoc i sila"
"Zostan bohaterem"
"Abaddon"
"Apartheid"
"System"
"Zolnierz"

Personnel
Tomasz Lutek Frost - bass guitar
Bernard Beniu Szafrański - guitar
Tomasz Perełka Dorn - drums
Waldemar Kiki Jedyczkowski - vocals

Resources
http://homepages.nyu.edu/~cch223/poland/albums/abaddon_walczoswojawolnosc.html, URL accessed at 31 August 2006

1999 albums
Abaddon (band) albums